The Antidicomarians or Antidicomarianites, also called Dimoerites, were a Christian sect active from the 3rd to the 5th century. Their name was invented by an opponent, Epiphanius of Salamis, who described them as heretical in his Panarion. The existence of the Antidicomarians as an organized sect may be doubted, as it is attested only in Epiphanius, but the doctrines he attributes to them were certainly matters of lively debate in the late 4th century.

The Antidicomarians refused to accord any special status to Mary, mother of Jesus, and rejected the doctrine of her perpetual virginity, arguing that Joseph had consummated his marriage with Mary after Jesus was born. The sect can be seen as a reaction to the rise of Marian devotion and celibacy. According to Epiphanius, the Antidicomarians saw Apollinaris of Laodicea as a representative of the sect. He wrote a letter defending the majority opinion about Mary to the Christians of Arabia, a copy of which he included in his Panarion.

The view that the brothers of Jesus were the children of Mary and Joseph was held independently of the Antidicomarian sect in the early church: Tertullian, Hegesippus and Helvidius held it, while Origen mentions it. The Antidicomarian position on Mary became standard in Protestantism.

See also
Bonosus of Sardica, 4th-century theologian who rejected the perpetual virginity of Mary
Collyridianism, a contemporary Arabian sect said to have worshipped Mary

References

Ancient Christian controversies
Mariology